Parliamentary elections were held in Kosovo on 6 October 2019. The main opposition parties received the most votes, led by Vetëvendosje and the Democratic League of Kosovo (LDK). Vetëvendosje leader Albin Kurti became Prime Minister, forming a governing coalition with the LDK on an anti-corruption platform. He is the second Prime Minister not to have been a fighter of the Kosovo Liberation Army during the 1990s.

Background
On 19 July 2019 Prime Minister Ramush Haradinaj resigned after being summoned for questioning by the KSC in The Hague, Netherlands. 
The constitution requires the President to designate a new candidate to either form a government, or hold new elections in between 30 and 45 days after consultation with political parties or coalitions who hold a majority in the Assembly.
 
On 2 August 2019, President Hashim Thaçi asked the PANA Coalition to propose a new candidate to form a coalition government. However, other political parties opposed the move.

On 5 August 2019, the Assembly of Kosovo agreed to hold an extraordinary session on 22 August, planning to disband itself so that elections could be scheduled. Subsequently, on 22 August 2019, MPs voted to dissolve parliament, with 89 of the 120 voting in favour, necessitating elections within 30–45 days.

Electoral system
The 120 members of the Assembly are elected by open list proportional representation, with 20 seats reserved for national minorities. An electoral threshold of 5% was in place for non-minority parties.

Parties and coalitions
On 7 September the Election Commission published the official list of the 25 participating parties and coalitions.

Opinion polls

Coalitions

Parties

Results
The initial results showed that the pro-government NISMA–AKR–PD alliance fell only a few hundred votes short of meeting the 5% electoral threshold and lost all 10 of their seats. However, the Kosovo Election Complaints and Appeals Panel subsequently ordered around 3,782 votes originating in Serbia to be removed from the vote count as they had been delivered by Serbian officials rather than by post. The removed votes allowed the NISMA-led alliance to cross the threshold and win six seats, a reduction of four from the prior election. Vetëvendosje and the Independent Liberal Party (which lost its parliamentary representation) were the only other parties to see a reduction in their seat totals. The Democratic League of Kosovo, Democratic Party of Kosovo, AAK–PSD alliance and the Serb List all gained seats. Voter turnout was around 45%.

Aftermath
After the election, Vetëvendosje leader Albin Kurti formed a coalition with the LDK. However, the government collapsed on 25 March following a motion of no confidence. Following the vote, the LDK formed a new government with the Alliance for the Future of Kosovo, the Social Democratic Initiative and the Serb List. However, due to the Constitutional Court's ruling and a deputy's conviction, the government collapsed again and another election will be held within 40 days starting from 22 December.

References

Kosovo
Parliamentary election
Elections in Kosovo
Kosovan parliamentary election